"One More Astronaut" is a song by Canadian rock band, I Mother Earth. It was released as the lead single from the band's second studio album, Scenery and Fish. The song reached #1 on Canada's Alternative chart. It was also the band's first song to chart in the United States. It is one of the band's most successful songs and is considered their signature song. The song ranked #58 on MuchMore's Top 100 Big Tunes of The 90s.

The song is featured as the first track on the first edition of MuchMusic's Big Shiny Tunes compilation series.

Charts

References

External links

1996 singles
I Mother Earth songs
1996 songs
EMI Records singles